Mount Blaurock is a high mountain summit of the Collegiate Peaks in the Sawatch Range of the Rocky Mountains of North America. Mount Blaurock was named in honor of Carl Blaurock, a co-founder of the Colorado Mountain Club and one of the first two persons to climb all of Colorado's fourteeners.

See also

List of Colorado mountain ranges
List of Colorado mountain summits
List of Colorado fourteeners
List of Colorado 4000 meter prominent summits
List of the most prominent summits of Colorado
List of Colorado county high points

References

External links

Mountains of Colorado
Mountains of Chaffee County, Colorado
San Isabel National Forest
North American 4000 m summits